The Kootenai Valley Railway Company was organized in 1898 to construct a rail line from Bonners Ferry, Idaho northward to the Idaho-British Columbia international boundary (26 miles). It was controlled by a subsidiary of the Great Northern Railway Company (GN), the Kootenay Railway & Navigation Company, until the latter's 1911 dissolution. KVRC was then absorbed into the GN, then formally dissolved in 1915.

References

Defunct Idaho railroads
Predecessors of the Burlington Northern Railroad
Predecessors of the Great Northern Railway (U.S.)